Gerald Walter Erskine Loder, 1st Baron Wakehurst, JP DL LLB (25 October 1861 – 30 April 1936) was a British barrister, businessman and Conservative politician. He is best remembered for developing the gardens at Wakehurst Place, Sussex.

Background and education
The fourth son of Sir Robert Loder, 1st Baronet, Member of Parliament for New Shoreham, Loder was educated at Eton and Trinity College, Cambridge. He became a barrister at the Inner Temple in 1888.

Career
Loder was Conservative Member of Parliament for Brighton from 1889 to 1905. He was private secretary to the President of the Local Government Board (Charles Ritchie) from 1888 to 1892 and to Lord George Hamilton (the Secretary of State for India) from 1896 to 1901. He served briefly under Arthur Balfour as a Lord of the Treasury in 1905. 

A keen gardener, Loder purchased the Wakehurst Place estate in 1903 and spent 33 years developing the gardens, which today cover some two square kilometres (500 acres) and are owned by the National Trust. He was president of the Royal Arboricultural Society from 1926 to 1927 and president of the Royal Horticultural Society from 1929 to 1931. He was a director of the London, Brighton and South Coast Railway from 1896, and served as its last chairman in December 1922. He was a director of its successor, the Southern Railway, and later chairman from 1934 until his resignation in December 1934. In June 1934 he was raised to the peerage as Baron Wakehurst, of Ardingly in the County of Sussex.

Family
Lord Wakehurst married Lady Louise de Vere Beauclerk, eldest daughter of William Beauclerk, 10th Duke of St Albans, in 1890. The couple had one son and four daughters:

 John de Vere Loder, 2nd Baron Wakehurst (born 5 February 1895, died 30 October 1970) - Margaret Tennant (daughter of industrialist Sir Charles Tennant, 1st Baronet and sister of many prominent figures of Victorian and Edwardian London, such as Margot Asquith and Edward Tennant, 2nd Baron Glenconner)
 Hon Dorothy Cicely Sybil Loder (born 1896, died 1986) - Hon.William Palmer (son of the Earl and Countess of Selborne, and thus a grandson of Prime Minister Lord Salisbury)
 Hon Victoria Helen Loder (born 1899, died November 1979) - Alan Rees Colman
 Hon Diana Evelyn Loder (born 1899, died 1985) - Donald Howard, 3rd Baron Strathcona and Mount Royal
 Hon Mary Irene Loder (born 1 May 1902, died 7 January 1970)

Death
Lord Wakehurst died in April 1936, aged 74, and was succeeded in the barony by his only son, John. The Loder Cup, New Zealand's oldest conservation award, is named after Lord Wakehurst.

References

External links
 

 

1861 births
1936 deaths
People educated at Eton College
Alumni of Trinity College, Cambridge
Barons in the Peerage of the United Kingdom
Deputy Lieutenants of Sussex
Members of the Inner Temple
Members of the Parliament of the United Kingdom for English constituencies
UK MPs 1886–1892
UK MPs 1892–1895
UK MPs 1895–1900
UK MPs 1900–1906
UK MPs who were granted peerages
Loder, Gerald
London, Brighton and South Coast Railway people
Southern Railway (UK) people
People from Ardingly
Barons created by George V
English barristers